Stefan Colakovski (born 20 April 2000) is a professional footballer who plays as a forward for A-League club Perth Glory. Born in Australia, he has also been called up for North Macedonia U21.

Early life
Colakovski is Macedonian-Australian. He was a fan of the previously named Melbourne Heart (now as Melbourne City).

Club career

Melbourne City
After playing in Melbourne City's youth setup for three years, on 4 November 2019, Colakovski made his senior professional debut against Wellington Phoenix in the A-League. On 1 February 2020, Colakovski was offered a full senior deal contract for Melbourne City.

Colakovski scored his first A-League goal in a Melbourne Derby match in the 2020–21 season by scoring the sixth and final goal in a 6–0 win against Melbourne Victory. Colakovski scored his second A-League goal for Melbourne City against Macarthur FC in the 2021 A-League Finals Series. He assisted Marco Tilio for his second goal in the A-League to put Melbourne City through to the Grand Finals.

Perth Glory 
In June 2022, it was announced that Colakovski signed with Perth Glory on a two-year deal.

Career statistics

Club

International

Notes

Honours
Melbourne City
 A-League Premiership: 2020–21 2021-22
 A-League Championship: 2021

References

External links

2000 births
Living people
Macedonian footballers
North Macedonia under-21 international footballers
Australian soccer players
Association football forwards
Melbourne City FC players
A-League Men players
Australian people of Macedonian descent
Soccer players from Melbourne